Bridport Football Club is a football club based in Bridport, Dorset, England.

History
The club was established on 7 October 1885. In 1896 they became founder members of the Dorset League. However, after finishing bottom of the league in 1897–98 the club left the league. They subsequently returned in 1906–07, but left after finishing bottom again. The club went on to play in the South Dorset and West Dorset leagues, before joining the Perry Street & District League. They were league champions in 1912–13, 1922–23 and 1931–32.

In 1957 Bridport were founder members of the Dorset Combination. They won the League Cup in the league's inaugural season, beating 15th RASC in the final, and retained the trophy the following season, defeating the same opponents. The club were league runners-up in 1959–60, and after finishing as runners-up the following season (also losing in the League Cup final to Dorchester Town reserves), they moved up to the Western League. The club won the league's Challenge Cup in 1970–71 and again in 1972–73. When the Western League gained a second division in 1976, Bridport were placed in the Premier Division. They won the Challenge Cup for a third time in 1977–78, and the Dorset Senior Cup in 1980–81.

Midway through the 1983–84 season Bridport resigned from the Western League, with the reserves (playing in the Dorset Combination) becoming the first team. They were Dorset Combination champions in 1985–86, and after retaining the league title and winning the League Cup for the next two seasons, as well as winning the Dorset Senior Cup in 1987–88, the club were promoted to Division One of the Western League. In 1993–94 they were Division One runners-up, earning promotion to the Premier Division. The club were relegated back to Division One at the end of the 2004–05 season, although they did win the Dorset Senior Cup again. They were promoted to the Premier Division in 2010–11 after finishing third in Division One. In 2021–22 the club were relegated to the South West Peninsula League, picking up just four points by early April.

Ground

After playing at several different grounds, in 1930 the club moved to Crown Field on West Bay Road. They remained at Crown Field until 1953, when the club relocated to St Mary's Field, bringing with them a 200-seat wooden stand which was placed on one side of the pitch. A covered stand was erected on the other side of the pitch during the 1960s. The wooden stand was later replaced with a new 180-seat stand, with the covered stand also replaced with a more modern structure. A clubhouse known as 'the Beehive' is situated behind one goal.

Floodlights were installed in 1990 and inaugurated with a match against Yeovil Town on 8 August, with Bridport winning 4–3.

Honours
Western League
League Cup winners 1970–71, 1972–73, 1977–78
Dorset Combination
Champions 1985–86, 1986–87, 1987–88
League Cup winners 1957–58, 1958–59, 1986–87, 1987–88
Perry Street & District League
Champions 1912–13, 1922–23, 1931–32
Dorset Senior Cup
Winners 1980–81, 1987–88, 2004–05

Records
Best FA Cup performance: Third qualifying round, 1957–58, 2017–18
Best FA Trophy performance: Third qualifying round, 1971–72
Best FA Vase performance: Fifth round, 1988–89
Record attendance: 1,150 vs Exeter City, 1981

See also
Bridport F.C. players
Bridport F.C. managers

References

External links
Official website

 
Football clubs in England
Football clubs in Dorset
Association football clubs established in 1885
1885 establishments in England
Bridport
Dorset Football League
Perry Street and District League
Dorset Premier Football League
Western Football League